The Copenhagen Wolves were a Danish professional esports organization which had players competing in Counter-Strike: Global Offensive, Hearthstone, and League of Legends. The organization ceased all operations on 6 June 2016, citing the responsibilities of its owners in other organizations, namely Astralis and Ninjas in Pyjamas. It was founded in 2009 and folded on 6 June 2016. It was based in Copenhagen, Denmark.

Counter-Strike: Global Offensive

Final roster

League of Legends 

The Copenhagen Wolves sold its spot in the EU Challenger Series to Nerv and disbanded its League of Legends division on 3 June 2016.

Final roster

External links 

 Official website

References 

2009 establishments in Denmark
2016 disestablishments in Denmark
Esports teams based in Denmark
Defunct and inactive Counter-Strike teams
Defunct and inactive Dota teams
Defunct and inactive Hearthstone teams
Esports teams established in 2009
Esports teams disestablished in 2016
Former European League of Legends Championship Series teams